Lake Albano (Italian: Lago Albano or Lago di Castel Gandolfo) is a small volcanic crater lake in the Alban Hills of Lazio, at the foot of Monte Cavo,  southeast of Rome. Castel Gandolfo, overlooking the lake, is the site of the Papal Palace of Castel Gandolfo.

It hosted the canoeing and rowing events of the 1960 Summer Olympic Games that were held in Rome.  The lane marking system developed for these events is commonly referred to as the Albano buoy system.

History and geology
In Roman times, it was known as Albanus Lacus and lay not far from the ancient city of Alba Longa.

Plutarch reports that in 406BC the lake surged over the surrounding hills, despite there being no rain nor tributaries flowing into the lake to account for the rise in water level. The ensuing flood destroyed fields and vineyards before eventually pouring into the sea.
It is thought to have been caused by volcanic gases, trapped in sediment at the bottom of the lake and gradually building up until suddenly releasing, causing the water to overflow.

Drainage tunnel
Around 395BC, during the wars between Rome and Veii, a discharge tunnel was built crossing the crater walls.
It served as an emissary whenever the water level overflowed its mouth.
According to Titus Livius, this feat of engineering was incited by the Oracle of Delphi: the Roman victory against Veii would be possible only when the lake waters were channeled and used for irrigation.
The emissary is at 293 meters over the sea level. The tunnel (1200 m long, 1,20 m wide and 2 m high) ends at a spot called Le Mole, below Castel Gandolfo, where the water flow drove multiple watermills.

Lake Albanus in Roman Myth
During the war with Veii in 393 BC, the level of Lake Albano rose to an unusual height even in the absence of rain. This prodigy was believed to be relevant on the siege of Veii because a haruspex from Veii recited some lines of a prophecy that illustrated the relationship between the level of its waters and either the safety or the fall of the town to the Romans. It foretold that as long as the waters of the lake remain high Veii would be impregnable to the Romans. If the waters of the lake were scattered in an inland direction on the other hand Veii would fall; but if they were to overflow through the usual streams or channels toward the sea this fact would be unfavourable to the Romans as well.
Dumézil ascribed this story to the Roman custom of projecting religious legendary heritage onto history, considering it as a festival myth, aimed at giving relevance to an exceptional event which would have happened during the Neptunalia. This legend would show the scope of the powers hidden in waters and the religious importance of their control by man: Veientans too knowing the fact had been digging channels for a long time as recent archaeological finds confirm. There is a temporal coincidence between the conjuration of the prodigy and the works of derivation recommended by Palladius and Columella at the time of the canicula, when the waters are at their lowest.

References

Bibliography

Britannica.com (retrieved: 12 March 2009)
Italian Tourism – Lakes (retrieved: 12 March 2009)
The Columbia Encyclopedia, Sixth Edition | Date: 2008 | The Columbia Encyclopedia, Sixth Edition, Columbia University Press (retrieved: 12 March 2009)

Castelli Romani
Venues of the 1960 Summer Olympics
Olympic canoeing venues
Olympic rowing venues
Albano, Lake of
Albano, Lake
Albano, Lake
Alba Longa